Lulu Brud (born 1985) is an American actress and interior designer, best known for her role as Sabrina in Pretty Little Liars.

Career
Brud is an actress and interior designer.

Selected filmography

Selected television
90210 new generation (2010)
Pretty Little Liars (2015–2017)
Ray Donovan (2018)

Private life
Her best friend since they were at high school together is Troian Bellisario.

Brud married in November 2013.

References

External links

Living people
1985 births